The Human Duplicators is a 1965 American science fiction film by Woolner Brothers Pictures Inc. Produced and directed by Hugo Grimaldi and Arthur C. Pierce (the latter uncredited as director), the film stars George Nader, Barbara Nichols, George Macready and Dolores Faith. It was shown in the US on a double feature with Mutiny in Outer Space.

The narrative follows a very tall space alien (Richard Kiel) who has come to earth at the command of the "Intergalactic Council" to replace select humans with "android doppelgängers." The goal of human duplication is to take over the earth, but the plan fails when the androids are destroyed by an investigator from the US National Intelligence Agency.

Plot
Aboard a spacecraft heading toward earth, the head of the "Intergalactic Council" (Ted Durant) briefs Dr. Kolos (Richard Kiel), a gigantic humanoid alien, on his part to "expand our galaxy domination program." If Kolos succeeds, human duplicates - androids - will begin taking over. If he fails, he will be destroyed.

After arriving via "teletransporter" at the mansion of Dr. Vaughan Dornheimer (Macready), Kolos encounters Dornheimer's blind niece, Lisa (Faith). Not realizing that he's an extraterrestrial, she take Kolos to Dornheimer's laboratory. Kolos tells Dornheimer that together they will develop the sophisticated androids that Dornheimer is unable to create on his own. Dornheimer refuses, but Kolos makes it clear that he is now "the master" and that he will be obeyed.

The police, meanwhile, are stymied by multiple thefts from high-security electronics facilities, apparently perpetrated by the "top scientists" who work at them. Most baffling of all is Dr. Munson (Walter Abel). After being admitted to his facility, he tears a security door off it hinges with his bare hands and kills a guard. He then ignores shouted warnings to halt by a second guard, who shoots him four times in the back. Munson neither flinches nor bleeds, just gets into his car and calmly drives off as if nothing unusual has happened. He's an android, although the police don't know it.

Glenn Martin (George Nader) of the National Intelligence Agency (NIA) takes over the case. Glenn fails to find out anything by posing as a reporter, although he meets Lisa. He later sneaks into Dornheimer's lab and witnesses human duplication. Lisa tells him that Dornheimer has been replaced by an android. As she leaves, Glenn is attacked by an android version of Dornheimer's servant Thor (John Indrisano). In the ensuing fight, Glenn smashes android Thor's head, destroying him. Kolos hauls Glenn off to be duplicated.

After duplication, android Glenn returns to NIA headquarters, where Gale Wilson (Nichols), Glenn's girlfriend and fellow agent, notices his oddly cold behavior. She wonders if Glenn is an android and decides to tail him.

Android Glenn goes to a facility to steal additional electronics. He is interrupted by Gale, then gets into a gunfight with the police, during which his arm is trapped in a sliding door. When the police yank the door open, expecting to arrest the real Glenn, all they find is android Glenn's arm. He has torn it off and escaped.

The real Glenn is locked in a cell with the real Dornheimer. Lisa brings Glenn his "lucky coin," which contains a wire that he can use to cut through the cell's bars. She is then dragged away by two android lab assistants. As he saws the bars, the real Dornheimer tells him that he can destroy the androids by zapping their heads with the lab's "pulse laser beam."

When Kolos refuses to turn Lisa into an android, android Dornheimer unexpectedly proclaims himself head of the android "master race" and has Kolos chained to a wall by the half-dozen android Thors it takes to overpower him, then begins the process of duplicating Lisa. But suddenly android Glenn returns, interrupting the duplication. Still loyal to Kolos, android Glenn refuses to accept android Dornheimer as master. They fight, destroying each other. The real Glenn zaps the remaining androids as Kolos breaks free of his chains.

After the androids have been destroyed, Kolos gently places the unconscious Lisa on a sofa. Her eyelids flutter open. She puts a hand to the corner of one eye and smiles.

Kolos says that his mission has failed and, sadly, he has learned that he too is an android. He teletransports back aboard the spaceship, presumably to meet his doom at the hands of the Intergalactic Council.

Cast
George Nader as Glenn Martin
Barbara Nichols as Gale Wilson
George Macready  as Prof. Vaughan Dornheimer
Dolores Faith  as Lisa Dornheimer
Hugh Beaumont as Austin Welles
Richard Arlen as NIA head
Richard Kiel as Dr. Kolos
John Indrisano as Thor
Ted Durant as voice of the head of the Intergalactic Council
Tommy Leonetti as Reporter
Lori Lyons as Miss Hart
Margaret Teele as Blonde Lab Assistant (in credits as Margot Teele)
Alean "Bambi" Hamilton as Brunette Lab Assistant (in credits as Aleane "Bambi" Hamilton)
Walter Abel as Dr. Munson (uncredited)
Unnamed characters: Lonnie Sattin; Mel Ruick (in credits as Melville Ruick); Walter Maslow; Larry Barton; Kim Satana; Benito Prezia; John Dasten (in credits as John Daston); Richard Schuyler; William White (in credits as Bill Hampton); and Andrew Johnson.

Production 
The Human Duplicators''' interior shots were filmed at Producers Studio in Hollywood. Exterior locations were Bronson Canyon in Griffith Park in Los Angeles and a school located at 5210 Clinton Street, which was used as the Space Research Corp. building where the scientists work. The exact dates of filming are unavailable, but Hugo Grimaldi Productions copyrighted the film on October 21, 1964.

In The Overlook Film Encyclopedia: Science Fiction, British film scholar Phil Hardy lists the movie as an American-Italian co-production made by Woolner Brothers and Independenti Regionali. It was one of two such co-productions directed by Grimaldi and released in 1965, the other being its companion film Mutiny in Outer Space.

Why Richard Kiel's name was not included on the movie poster remains a mystery, although the packaging of a VHS tape of unknown date identifies the film's stars as "Richard 'Jaws' Kiel and Hugh 'Ward Cleaver' Beaumont." The film was Beaumont's final picture before retiring from acting.

ReleaseThe Human Duplicators was the color first feature on a double bill with the black-and-white Mutiny in Outer Space.

The film was released in the US on 3 March 1965 and at an unspecified date the same year in Canada. It opened in Mexico on 14 December 1967 as Humanoides asesinos ("Humanoids, murderers"). A day later in West Germany, where Nader was well known for playing "tough FBI agent Jerry Cotton in eight highly successful but rubbishy crime thrillers" it premiered as FBI jagt Phantom ("FBI hunts Phantom"). The movie was released to theaters in Italy as Agente Spaziale K-1 ("Space Agent K-1") and in France as Les Créatures de Kolos ("The Creatures of Kolos"). In Belgium it was shown under both the French title and the Dutch title Schepsels van Kolos ("Creatures of Kolos"). The film was also released theatrically in Brazil, Greece and Spain. In France, the video version's title was Kolos, l'agent cosmique ("Kolos, the Cosmic Agent"). One of the titles used for a VHS of the movie in the US was Jaws of the Alien. Kiel appeared as the character Jaws in The Spy Who Loved Me (1977) and Moonraker (1979).

The movie was theatrically released in the US by Woolner Brothers Pictures Inc., by International Film Distributors in Canada and by Regal Films International in the UK. Distribution in the US switched to Allied Artists in 1966 and 40 years later, in 2006, the American company Better Television Distribution had acquired the world-wide TV syndication rights. For personal home viewing, VHS tapes of The Human Duplicators were released in the 1980s by Joy Home Video in West Germany and at unknown dates by International Video Entertainment, ThrillerVideo and Star Classics Video in the US. The Star Classics VHS release is called Jaws of the Alien.

 Reception The Human Duplicators has not received particularly good reviews from critics over the years. "Whit" reviewed the film for the 19 May 1965 issue of Variety and called it "an okay entry in its field." He wrote that there was little new in the plot, but that it "generates enough interest to pass in minor situations" and has "exploitation value" for theater owners. "Whit" was somewhat complimentary about the production crew, noting that "Don Wolf's editing is fairly fast."

British film scholar Phil Hardy calls the movie a "confused and over-ambitious offering from Grimaldi." He says that The Human Duplicators "marks the beginnings of a return to the technical gimmickry of the 1930s".

British critic Steven Puchalski refers to the film as a "colourful dose of swill" with a "silly plot and comical goofiness going for it." He makes specific mention of the special effects, sarcastically noting that "The highly technical duplication process involves the victims standing in a circular cage while red and blue lights flash at them," after which "they sit under clear plastic hair dryers until their brains harden." He adds that for unknown reasons the androids have heads made of plaster, "so whenever they're knocked on the noggin, their skulls crack open and Erector Set pieces tumble out. Oops! Design flaw, indeed ...."

Kiel himself seems to have had mixed feelings about the film. He said in an interview with American film scholar Tom Weaver that the film "was a big hit in Chicago," where it played "in like 27 theaters" simultaneously. Kiel made personal appearances at theaters that were showing the movie in Chicago and said that they were so successful that he was asked to do the same in Toronto. But he told interviewer Maggie Howard in 2009 that "The way the director wanted me to act - kind of robotic - didn't come off as well as I would have liked."

In popular cultureThe Human Duplicators was shown as Episode 6 of Season 3 of Elvira's Movie Macabre, which first aired on 5 August 1984. The film was later featured in a season 4 episode of Mystery Science Theater 3000'' originally telecast on 26 December 1992.

See also
 List of American films of 1965

References

External links
 

1965 films
1960s science fiction films
American science fiction films
Android (robot) films
1960s English-language films
Films shot in Los Angeles
American independent films
1965 independent films
1960s American films
English-language science fiction films